This is a list of Game Boy and Game Boy Color games that use enhancements, color palettes, or other features of the Super Game Boy, organized alphabetically by title. See Lists of video games for related lists.

Notes
Some games will have enhanced music tracks and voice samples if played on the Super Game Boy.
Some games have hidden borders only available by inputting a code on the title screen or while playing the game. The games are: The Legend of Zelda: Link's Awakening DX, Balloon Fight GB, Mario's Picross, Space Invaders (GB), Picross 2, Super Black Bass, Super Black Bass Pocket 2, Tetris 2, Tetris Attack and TNN Outdoor Fishing Champ.
TNN Outdoor Fishing Champ is missing a border found on the Japanese version's ending due to that ending being cut for the USA release.
Some games, such as Bomberman Quest, have borders that only show by linking a Super Game Boy 2 with a Game Boy.
The Game & Watch Gallery series will show a Super NES controller under Mode Select instead of a Game Boy system if played on the Super Game Boy. Also, when playing one of the mini-games in "Classic" mode, the Super Game Boy will display borders around the screen that mimic the original Game & Watch casing designs.
Some games (mostly Takara fighting games, but a few others) have special two player modes using two Super NES controllers on Super Game Boy. A few of the SGB Bomberman games (such as Wario Blast) allow for four players using a Super Multitap (or any compatible multiplayer adapter) and four controllers.
Rumble cartridges have their rumble function disabled when played on a Super Game Boy, even if they are not otherwise enhanced, such as in Hole in One Golf or Test Drive Off-Road 3.
Several Nintendo-published Game Boy games that were released prior to the Super Game Boy are not otherwise enhanced, but do have special default palettes when played on it. Those will be noted in the table column Palettes - Special Default.
Mary-Kate and Ashley: Pocket Planner identifies itself as having Super Game Boy support in its internal cartridge header, but the game appears to have no support.
There are  games on Super Game Boy

List
Note: The list of features and regions are incomplete. You can help if know much about them. However, you may have to link citations for evidence.

See also
Lists of Game Boy games

Super Game Boy